The 2006–07 season was Burnley's 7th season in the second tier of English football. They were managed by Steve Cotterill in his third full season since he replaced Stan Ternent at the beginning of the 2004–05 season.

Appearances and goals
Source:
Numbers in parentheses denote appearances as substitute.
Players with names struck through and marked  left the club during the playing season.
Players with names in italics and marked * were on loan from another club for the whole of their season with Burnley.
Players listed with no appearances have been in the matchday squad but only as unused substitutes.
Key to positions: GK – Goalkeeper; DF – Defender; MF – Midfielder; FW – Forward

Transfers

In

Out

Matches

Championship

Final league position

League Cup

1st Round

FA Cup

3rd Round

References

Burnley F.C. seasons
Burnley